Distearoylphosphatidylcholine is a phosphatidylcholine, a kind of phospholipid. It is a natural constituent of cell membranes, eg. soybean phosphatidylcholines are mostly different 18-carbon phosphatidylcholines (including minority of saturated DSPC), and their hydrogenation results in 85% DSPC.
It can be used to prepare lipid nanoparticles which are used in mRNA vaccines,  In particular, it forms part of the drug delivery system for the Moderna and Pfizer COVID-19 vaccines.

See also
Moderna COVID-19 vaccine nanoparticle ingredients
SM-102
DMG-PEG 2000

Others
 Stearic acid, contributing stearoyl- group
 Phosphocholine

References

Phosphatidylcholines